Miles! The Definitive Miles Davis at Montreux DVD Collection 1973–1991 is a 10-DVD box set by Miles Davis, comprising 10 separate concerts and interviews, recorded in Montreux, Switzerland, between 1973 and 1991.

Tracks, personnel and audio format

All DVDs are in PCM Stereo, Dolby Surround 5.1, and DTS Digital Surround.

DVD1: July 8, 1973

Tracks: Ife. Bonus Features: Interviews with Claude Nobs, Carlos Santana and Herbie Hancock; About Miles Davis, with Monty Alexander, Helen Merrill, Betty Carter, Charlie Haden, Gil Goldstein, Stanley Clarke, Jean-Luc Ponty, Al Di Meola, Michel Petrucciani. Concert runtime: 28 minutes; Bonus Features runtime: 114 minutes.

Personnel: Miles Davis: trumpet, organ; Dave Liebman: tenor saxophone, soprano saxophone, flute; Reggie Lucas: guitar; Pete Cosey: guitar, percussion; Michael Henderson: bass; Al Foster: drums; James Mtume: congas, percussion.

DVD2: July 8, 1984 (Afternoon)

Tracks: Speak/That's What Happened; Star People; What It Is; It Gets Better; Something's On Your Mind; Time After Time; Hopscotch/Stars on Cicely; Bass Solo; Jean-Pierre; Lake Geneva; Something's On Your Mind (Reprise). Runtime: 98 minutes.

Personnel: Miles Davis: trumpet; Bob Berg: saxophone, keyboards; Robert Irving III: keyboards; John Scofield: guitar; Darryl Jones: bass; Al Foster: drums; Steve Thornton: percussion.

DVD3: July 8, 1984 (Evening)

Tracks: Speak/That's What Happened; Star People; What It Is; It Gets Better; Something's On Your Mind; Time After Time; Hopscotch/Stars on Cicely; Bass Solo; Jean-Pierre; Lake Geneva; Something's On Your Mind (Reprise). Runtime: 109 minutes.

Personnel: As DVD2.

DVD4: July 4, 1985 (Afternoon)

Tracks: Theme From Jack Johnson/One Phone Call/Street Scenes/That's What Happened; Star People; Maze; Human Nature; MD1/Something's On Your Mind/MD2; Time After Time; Code MD; Pacific Express; Hopscotch; You're Under Arrest; Jean-Pierre/You're Under Arrest/Then There Were None; Decoy. Runtime: 120 minutes.

Personnel: Miles Davis: trumpet; Bob Berg: saxophone, keyboards; Robert Irving III: keyboards; John Scofield: guitar; Darryl Jones: bass; Vince Wilburn Jr.: drums; Steve Thornton: percussion.

DVD5: July 4, 1985 (Evening)

Tracks: Theme From Jack Johnson/One Phone Call/Street Scenes/That's What Happened; Star People; Maze; MD1/Something's On Your Mind/MD2; Time After Time; Code MD; Pacific Express; Hopscotch; You're Under Arrest; Jean-Pierre/You're Under Arrest/Then There Were None; Decoy. Runtime: 121 minutes.

Personnel: As DVD4.

DVD6: July 17, 1986

Tracks: Theme From Jack Johnson/One Phone Call/Street Scenes/That's What Happened; New Blues; Maze; Human Nature; Wrinkle; Tutu; Splatch; Time After Time; Al Jarreau; Carnival Time; Burn; Portia; Jean-Pierre. Runtime: 106 minutes.

Personnel: Miles Davis: trumpet, keyboards; Bob Berg: saxophone; Adam Holzman: keyboards; Robert Irving III: keyboards; Robben Ford: guitar; Felton Crews: bass; Vince Wilburn Jr.: drums; Steve Thornton: percussion; George Duke: synthesizer (6, 7); David Sanborn: saxophone (11-13).

DVD7: July 7, 1988

Tracks: In a Silent Way; Intruder; New Blues; Perfect Way; The Senate/Me & U; Human Nature; Wrinkle; Tutu; Time After Time; Movie Star; Splatch; Heavy Metal Prelude; Heavy Metal; Carnival Time; Jean-Pierre; Tomaas. Runtime: 130 minutes.

Personnel: Miles Davis: trumpet, keyboards; Kenny Garrett: saxophone; Adam Holzman: keyboards; Robert Irving III: keyboards; Foley: lead bass; Benny Reitveld: bass; Ricky Wellman: drums; Marilyn Mazur: percussion.

DVD8: July 21, 1989

Tracks: Intruder; New Blues; Perfect Way; Hannibal; Human Nature; Mr Pastorius; Tutu; Jilli; Time After Time; Jo Jo; The Senate/Me & U; Wrinkle; Portia. Runtime: 113 minutes.

Personnel: Miles Davis: trumpet, keyboards; Rick Margitza: tenor saxophone; Adam Holzman: keyboards; Robert Irving III: keyboards; Foley: lead bass; Benny Reitveld: bass; Ricky Wellman: drums; Marilyn Mazur: percussion.

DVD9: July 20, 1990

Tracks: Hannibal; The Senate/Me & U; In The Night; Human Nature; Time After Time; Wrinkle; Tutu; Don't Stop Me Now; Carnival Time. Runtime: 93 minutes.

Personnel: Miles Davis: trumpet, keyboards; Kenny Garrett: saxophone; Kei Akagi: keyboards; Foley: lead bass; Richard Patterson: bass; Ricky Wellman: drums; Erin Davis: percussion.

DVD10: July 8, 1991

Tracks: Introduction by Claude Nobs & Quincy Jones; Boplicity; Maids of Cadiz; The Duke; My Ship; Miles Ahead; Blues for Pablo; Orgone; Gone, Gone, Gone; Summertime; Here Comes De Honey Man; The Pan Piper; Solea.

Personnel: Miles Davis: trumpet; Quincy Jones: conductor; Kenny Garrett: alto saxophone; Wallace Roney: trumpet, flugelhorn; Lew Soloff: trumpet; Miles Evans: trumpet; Tom Malone: trombone; Alex Foster: alto saxophone, soprano saxophone and flute; George Adams: tenor saxophone and flute; Gil Goldstein: keyboards; Delmar Brown: keyboards; Kenwood Dennard: drums (8); percussion; Benny Bailey: trumpet, flugelhorn; Charles Benavent: bass, electric bass (12, 13); Grady Tate: drums; George Gruntz Concert Jazz Band. Runtime: 60 minutes.

External links
 All About Jazz review
 CD Universe Information

Miles Davis albums